Goločelo may refer to the following villages in Serbia:
 Goločelo, Koceljeva in Mačva District
 Goločelo (Stanovo) in Šumadija District